Deering may refer to:

Places in the United States 
 Deering, Alaska, a city
 Deering, Maine, a former town annexed to Portland in 1898
 Deering, Missouri, an unincorporated community
 Deering, New Hampshire, a town
 Deering Reservoir
 Deering, North Dakota, a city

People 
 Adolph A. Deering, American politician
 Charles Deering (1852–1927), American business man and philanthropist
 Fred Deering (1923-2010), American politician
 James Deering (1859–1925), American industrialist, developer of Miami, Florida
 John Deering (baseball) (1879–1943), Major League Baseball pitcher
 John Deering (murderer) (1898–1938), American murderer executed by firing squad in Utah
 John Deering (politician) (1833-1904), American politician and mayor of Portland, Maine
 Myles Deering (born 1953), Army National Guard major general
 Pat Deering (born 1967), Irish politician
 Richard Dering (c. 1580–1630), also spelled Deering, English Renaissance and Baroque composer 
 Rupert Deering, commandant of the penal settlement at Norfolk Island
 Steve Deering, Canadian computer scientist
 Terry Deering, American politician
 William Deering (1826–1913), American business man and philanthropist

Companies 
 Deering Harvester Company, founded in 1894 by William Deering
 Deering Banjo Company, founded in 1975 by Greg and Janet Deering

Other uses 
 Deering Library, Northwestern University, Evanston, Illinois, United States
 Deering High School, Portland, Maine, United States
 Deering Bridge, near Sutton, Nebraska, United States, on the National Register of Historic Places
 Carroll A. Deering, a sailing vessel found run aground in 1921
 Wilma Deering, a major fictional character associated with Buck Rogers